HMS Orford's Prize was a 24-gun French privateer, Le Gaillarde taken by HMS Orford on 2 October 1708. She was purchased and registered on 21 October 1708. She was commissioned into the Royal Navy in 1708 then retaken by the French in 1709.

Orford's Prize was the fourth ship so named since it was used for a 24-gun sixth rate launched by Ellis of Shoreham on 29 November 1695, renamed Newport on 3 September 1698, and sold in 1714.

Specifications
She was captured 2 October 1708 and purchased on 21 October 1708. Her tonnage calculation was  tons. Her armament was twenty-six 6-pounders on the upper deck with and four 3-pounders on the quarterdeck all on wooden trucks.

Commissioned Service
She was commissioned in 1708 under the command of Commander William Collier, RN.

Disposition
She was retaken by two 30-gun French privateers off Lundy on 27 May 1709. She resumed her French name La Gaillarde.

Citations

References
 Winfield, British Warships in the Age of Sail (1603 – 1714), by Rif Winfield, published by Seaforth Publishing, England © 2009, EPUB , Chapter 6, The Sixth Rates, Vessels acquired from 18 December 1688, Sixth Rates of 20 guns and up to 26 guns, Ex-French Prizes (1704–09), Orford's Prize
 Colledge, Ships of the Royal Navy, by J.J. Colledge, revised and updated by Lt Cdr Ben Warlow and Steve Bush, published by Seaforth Publishing, Barnsley, Great Britain, © 2020, e  (EPUB), Section S (Orford's Prize)

 

1680s ships
Corvettes of the Royal Navy
Naval ships of the United Kingdom